Angiostoma limacis is a species of parasitic nematodes.

Hosts 
 Limax maximus

References 

Angiostomatidae
Nematodes described in 1845